Pablo Iturralde Viñas (born 23 September 1959) is an Uruguayan politician and attorney who has been the President of the Board of the National Party since May 2020. He previously served as National Representative between 2005 and 2020.

Biography 
Born in Melo, Iturralde graduated from the University of the Republic with a Law degree.

Political career 
He begins his political militancy in the Movement for the Fatherland. In the 1989 elections, he heads the list 430, "The Young Whites". During Luis Alberto Lacalle's government between 1990 and 1993, he was general labor inspector and from 1993 to 1995 he was the head of the National Directorate of Labor in the Ministry of Labour and Social Welfare. From 1995 to 2000, he was a substitute senator for the Wilsonist Current, embodied in Juan Andrés Ramírez's 903 list. 

In 2003 he joined Senator Jorge Larrañaga's sector, supporting him as a pre-candidate in the 2004 presidential primaries; along with Javier García and Álvaro F. Lorenzo, they led the most voted list by Montevideo in June. Therefore, in the general election of that year, Iturralde led the list to deputies by the National Alliance sector, being elected to the Chamber of Representatives and Secretary of the Honorable Directory of the National Party.

In May 2020, he was elected President of the Board of the National Party, succeeding Pablo Abdala who resigned from the post to be the head of the Institute of Children and Adolescents of Uruguay.

References

External links 

 

National Party (Uruguay) politicians
20th-century Uruguayan lawyers
Members of the Chamber of Representatives of Uruguay
1959 births
Living people